Stanisław Łapiński (25 September 1895 – 26 January 1972) was a Polish film actor. He appeared in more than 20 films between 1931 and 1966.

Selected filmography
 Każdemu wolno kochać (1933)
 Pieśniarz Warszawy (1934)
 Police Chief Antek (1935)
 Róża (1936)
 The Three Hearts (1939)
 A Matter to Settle (1953)
 Tonight a City Will Die (1961)

References

External links

1895 births
1972 deaths
Polish male film actors
Male actors from Warsaw
Polish male stage actors